Sylvester is an unincorporated community in Fisher County, Texas, United States. According to the Handbook of Texas, the community had an estimated population of 79 in 2000.

Geography
Sylvester is located at  (32.7209445, -100.2542708). It is situated at the junction of Farm Roads 57 and 1085 in east central Fisher County, approximately 10 miles southeast of Roby and 43 miles northwest of Abilene.

History
The Compere brothers of Abilene are credited with the founding of the community in 1903. They bought part of the AJ Ranch in anticipation of the arrival of the Kansas, Mexico and Orient Railway and named it in honor of W.W. Sylvester, the railroad's promotion manager. The rails reached Sylvester in 1905 and businesses followed. By 1909, the community had an estimated population of 600. Sylvester incorporated in 1927 and the 1930 reported 382 residents. That figure rose to 405 in 1940. Competition from nearby towns caused Sylvester to decline. It had reverted to unincorporated status by 1950 and by the 1980s, fewer than 100 people remained in the community, but supported a grocery store Sylvester Mercantile owned and operated by C. L. "Chubb" Hardwick, a Cotton Gin owned operated by the Jeffery Family of McCaulley, a gas station owned and operated by Truman Mauldin, as well as a seasonal granary.

Although Sylvester is unincorporated, it continues to have a post office in operation with the zip code of 79560.  During the 1960s and 1970s the U.S. Post Office was managed by Postmaster Mrs. Buford (Ruth Brown), who retired in the late 1970s.  Mrs. Bobbie Hardwick was Postmaster until her retirement in 1999.

To date, the only non-agricultural business in the community is the Sylvester McCaulley Water Supply managed by Randy Kelly.

Education

Sylvester had an elementary school and high school in one building. The first senior class graduated in 1914. The school closed in the summer of 1953, and students began attending schools in the Roby Consolidated Independent School District.

References

External links

Unincorporated communities in Fisher County, Texas
Unincorporated communities in Texas
Former cities in Texas
1903 establishments in Texas